The 1978 Yukon general election was held on November 20, 1978, was the first conventional legislative election in the history of Canada's Yukon Territory. Prior elections were held to elect representatives to the Yukon Territorial Council, a non-partisan body that acted in an advisory role to the Commissioner of the Yukon. Following the passage of the Yukon Elections Act in 1977, the 1978 election was the first time that voters in the Yukon elected representatives to the Yukon Legislative Assembly in an election organized along political party lines.

Hilda Watson, the first woman ever to lead a political party into an election in Canada, was the leader of the Progressive Conservatives. Although the party won the election, Watson herself was defeated in Kluane by Liberal candidate Alice McGuire, and thus did not become government leader. The position of government leader instead went to Chris Pearson.

New Democratic leader Fred Berger was also defeated in his own riding. He remained leader of the party until 1981, when he was succeeded by the party's sole elected MLA, Tony Penikett. Under Penikett's leadership, an MLA who had been elected as an independent in 1978 joined the NDP, and the party won a by-election. With its caucus increased to three members, the NDP had thus supplanted the Liberals as the official opposition by the time of the 1982 election.

Results by Party

|- style="background:#ccc;"
! rowspan="2" colspan="2" style="text-align:left;"|Party
! rowspan="2" style="text-align:left;"|Party leader
!rowspan="2"|Candidates
! colspan="4" style="text-align:center;"|Seats
!colspan="3" style="text-align:center;"|Popular vote
|- style="background:#ccc;"
| style="text-align:center;"|1974
| style="text-align:center;font-size: 80%;"|Dissol.
| style="text-align:center;"|1978
| style="text-align:center;"|Change
| style="text-align:center;"|#
| style="text-align:center;"|%
| style="text-align:center;"|Change

|align=left|Hilda Watson
|align="right"|15
|align="right"|0
|align="right"|0
|align="right"|11
|align="right"|+11
|align="right"|2,869
|align="right"|37.10%
|align="right"|N/A

|align=left|Iain MacKay
|align="right"|14
|align="right"|0
|align="right"|0
|align="right"|2
|align="right"|+2
|align="right"|2,201
|align="right"|28.46%
|align="right"|N/A

| colspan="2" style="text-align:left;"|Independent
|align="right"|9
|align="right"|12
|align="right"|12
|align="right"|2
|align="right"|-10
|align="right"|1,096
|align="right"|14.17%
|align="right"|N/A

|align=left|Fred Berger
|align="right"|14
|align="right"|0
|align="right"|0
|align="right"|1
|align="right"|+1
|align="right"|1,568
|align="right"|20.27%
|align="right"|N/A
|-
| style="text-align:left;" colspan="3"|Total
| style="text-align:right;"|52
| style="text-align:right;"|12
| style="text-align:right;"|12
| style="text-align:right;"|16
| style="text-align:right;"|+4
| style="text-align:right;"|7,734
| style="text-align:right;"|100.00%
| style="text-align:right;"|
|}

Incumbents not Running for Reelection
The following MLAs had announced that they would not be running in the 1978 election:

Independent
Flo Whyard (Whitehorse West)
Willard Phelps (Whitehorse Riverdale)

Results by Riding
Bold indicates party leaders
† - denotes a retiring incumbent MLA

|-
| style="background:whitesmoke;"|Campbell
|
|Don McIntosh61
|
|Blake Stirling Macdonald120
|
|Margaret Thomson65
||
|Robert Fleming184
||
|New District
|-
| style="background:whitesmoke;"|Faro
|
|
|
|
|
|Stuart McCall231
||
|Maurice Byblow361
||
|New District
|-
| style="background:whitesmoke;"|Hootalinqua
||
|Al Falle209
|
|Mike Laforet83
|
|Max Fraser159
|
|Mack Henry44
||
|Robert Fleming
|-
| style="background:whitesmoke;"|Klondike
||
|Meg McCall152
|
|
|
|Fred Berger130
|
|Eleanor Millard114
||
|Fred Berger
|-
| style="background:whitesmoke;"|Kluane
|
|Hilda Watson150
||
|Alice McGuire188
|
|
|
|John Livesey49
||
|Hilda Watson
|-
| style="background:whitesmoke;"|Mayo
||
|Swede Hanson95
|
|Gordon McIntyre84
|
|Alan McDiarmid82
|
|David Harwood85
||
|Gordon McIntyre
|-
| style="background:whitesmoke;"|Old Crow
||
|Grafton Njootli62
|
|Edith Tizya29
|
|Robert Bruce19
|
|
||
|New District
|-
| style="background:whitesmoke;"|Tatchun 
||
|Howard Tracey109
|
|Hugh Netzel71
|
|Jerry Roberts83
|
|
||
|New District
|-
| style="background:whitesmoke;"|Watson Lake
||
|Don Taylor226
|
|Grant Taylor188
|
|
|
|
||
|Don Taylor
|-
| style="background:whitesmoke;"|Whitehorse North Centre
||
|Geoff Lattin153
|
|Dermot Flynn83
|
|Doug Stephenson131
|
|Ken McKinnon141
||
|Ken McKinnon
|-
| style="background:whitesmoke;"|Whitehorse Porter Creek East
||
|Dan Lang322
|
|Bill Webber202
|
|Paul Warner84
|
|
||
|New District
|-
| style="background:whitesmoke;"|Whitehorse Porter Creek West
||
|Doug Graham188
|
|Clive Tanner142
|
|Kathy Horton60
|
|
||
|New District
|-
| style="background:whitesmoke;"|Whitehorse Riverdale North
||
|Chris Pearson358
|
|Richard Rotondo194
|
|Dave Dornian59
|
|
||
|New District
|-
| style="background:whitesmoke;"|Whitehorse Riverdale South
|
|Margaret Heath354
||
|Iain MacKay420
|
|Jim McCullough113
|
|
||
|New District
|-
| style="background:whitesmoke;"|Whitehorse South Centre
||
|Jack Hibberd245
|
|Bert Law197
|
|Ken Krocker122
|
|
||
|Jack Hibberd
|-
| style="background:whitesmoke;"|Whitehorse West
|
|Anthony Fekete185
|
|John Watt200
||
|Tony Penikett230
|
|Al Omotani81Guy Julien37
||
|Flo Whyard†
|}

Aftermath
After the election, four of the elected members in the Progressive Conservative Party, including Chris Pearson, were added to the Executive Committee headed by Commissioner Art Pearson.  In October 1979, at the instruction of Jake Epp, Federal Minister of Indian Affairs and Northern Development, the Commissioner withdrew from direct government administration; Chris Pearson became Government Leader (equal to Premier), added a fifth member of the PC Party caucus, and formed the Executive Council of Yukon, thus beginning responsible government with an elected head of government in The Yukon. Art Pearson would later resign as Commissioner after pleading guilty to charges related to improper mining claim transfers and was replaced with Frank Fingland.

References

1978
1978 elections in Canada
Election
November 1978 events in Canada